The 1981 New Zealand rugby union tour of Romania and France was a series of ten matches played by the New Zealand national rugby union team (the All Blacks) in Romania and France in October and November 1981. The All Blacks won eight of the ten games, including the international match against Romania and both internationals against France. The only team to defeat the All Blacks was a French regional selection, and the All Blacks were also held to a draw by another regional team.

Matches
Scores and results list New Zealand's points tally first.

Touring party

Manager: P. Gill
Assistant Manager: Peter Burke
Captain: Graham Mourie

Backs
Allan Hewson (Wellington)
Bernie Fraser (Wellington)
Stu Wilson (Wellington)
Fred Woodman (North Auckland)
Jamie Salmon (Wellington)
Arthur Stone (Waikato)
Lachie Cameron (Manawatu)
Steven Pokere (Southland)
Doug Rollerson (Manawatu)
Brian McKechnie (Southland)
Dave Loveridge (Taranaki)
Andrew Donald (Wanganui)
John Boe (Waikato) replacement during tour

Forwards
Murray Mexted (Wellington)
Geoff Old (Manawatu)
Graham Mourie (Taranank)
Frank Shelford (Bay of Plenty)
Mark Shaw (Manawatu)
Andy Haden (Auckland)
Gary Whetton (Auckland)
Jock Ross (Mid-Canterbury)
Rod Ketels (Counties)
Wayne Neville (North Auckland)
John Spiers (Counties)
Paul Koteka (Waikato)
Hika Reid (Bay of Plenty)
Andy Dalton (Counties)
Brian Morrissey (Waikato) replacement during tour

References

Notes 

1981 rugby union tours
1981
1981
1981
1981 in New Zealand rugby union
1981–82 in French rugby union
1981–82 in European rugby union
rugby union